Benoît Poelvoorde (born 22 September 1964) is a Belgian actor and comedian.

Early life
His mother was a grocer and his father a driver, who died when Poelvoorde was still a minor. He attended the Jesuit Boarding School of Godinne before he left home at 17 to take classes at the Félicien Rops Technical Institute in Namur (Belgium) where he met Rémy Belvaux. He developed a passion for theater and became noted for his atypical interpretations. Not only was he destined to become a draughtsman, he also developed professionality as a photographer. During his graphic design studies at the École de recherche graphique in Brussels, he also became friends with André Bonzel and, together with Rémy Belvaux, directed in 1988 Pas de C4 pour Daniel Daniel, his first movie, a student short film (which he co-directed and co-wrote). It was a stylized trailer for a mock-spy film.

Career

In 1992, Poelvoorde, Belvaux and Bonzel wrote, produced and directed together their first long feature C'est arrivé près de chez vous (Man Bites Dog internationally) originally a low-budget school graduation project (1992) and a kind of cynical "noir" movie, inspired from the famous Belgian series "Strip-Tease" which went on to become a critically acclaimed cult movie. The film received the André Cavens Award for Best Film by the Belgian Film Critics Association (UCC).

Poelvoorde subsequently starred in two series on the French pay-channel Canal+ and several movies such as Les Randonneurs, Le Boulet and Podium, which made him famous in France and Belgium. In 2001, he starred in Le Vélo de Ghislain Lambert, a movie about one of his passions, bicycling. In 2002, he received the Jean Gabin Prize, which recognized the most hopeful young talents. Poelvoorde became a member of the Cannes Film Festival Jury in 2004 by request of Quentin Tarantino, a big fan of Man Bites Dog who had presided over the Jury that year.

In 2005 he ranked in 7th place in the Walloon version of the Greatest Belgian. In the Flemish version he came in at nr. 400 outside the official list of nominations.

In 2008, his performance in the movie Astérix aux Jeux olympiques won him critical acclaim by both film critics and the public at large. His recurrent character as a pretentious person and a sore loser has drawn comparisons between him and the beloved French comedian Louis de Funès. Poelvoorde also played serious roles. He has starred in 2009 as Etienne Balsan in Coco avant Chanel by Anne Fontain, with Audrey Tautou; as Jean-René in 2010 with Isabelle Carré in a comedy by Jean-Pierre Améris Émotifs anonymes about two extremely shy persons who fall in love, and also as August Maquet in L'autre Dumas by Safy Nebbou, alongside Gérard Depardieu and Dominique Blanc, a movie about the creative ghostwriter, Maquet, who played a crucial role in the production of French writer Alexandre Dumas' Three Musketeers. 
For his work in A Place on Earth (2013), Poelvoorde received a Magritte Award for Best Actor.

The actor revealed in interviews, that he suffered from bipolar disorder.

In 2019, during the shooting of the movie "Raoul Taburin a un secret", from the book by the writer Jean-Jacques Sempé, Benoît Poelvoorde had a bicycle accident and received 17 stitches.

Selected filmography

Voice acting
 1996 : Les Guignols de l'info: Alain Madelin (1 episode) 
 2009 : A Town Called Panic

Short films
 1997 : Le Signaleur
 1988 : Pas de C4 pour Daniel Daniel by Rémy Belvaux and André Bonzel

References

External links

 
 
  Theatre acting career summary (from L'Annuaire du Spectacle on the Centre de recherche et de documentation littéraires et théâtrales de la Communauté française de Belgique web site)

1964 births
Belgian male actors
Belgian male comedians
Belgian film directors
Living people
Magritte Award winners
People from Namur (city)
People with bipolar disorder
Walloon people
Belgian male film actors
20th-century Belgian male actors
21st-century Belgian male actors